Taean County is a county in Chungcheongnam-do, South Korea.

Taean Haean National Park is located within Taean County, and is known for its clear seas, unpolluted soils, coastal flora, tidal flats, coasts, and white sand.  It includes thirty different beaches; one of these, Mallipo Beach, is considered one of the three most beautiful in Korea and is over three kilometers long.  This beach is also the site of the 2007 Korea oil spill.

The Korean government designated Taean Haean National Park in 1978. There are about 130 islands in the park, and 250 species of flora thrive there.

Chollipo Arboretum in Sowon-myeon, founded in 1979 by naturalized US-expatriate Min Byung Gal (Carl Ferris Miller), is a 64ha (158 acre) private botanical garden housing more than 6900 different species of plants collected from more than 60 countries.

The Sinduri beach in Taean is home to the Duung wetland, a sand dune wetland and protected area that is also designated a National Treasure of South Korea.

The Samsung-1 Hebei Spirit oil spill occurred on December 7, 2007, when a Hong Kong oil tanker, Hebei Spirit, and Samsung C&T's 12th tank collided with a shipyard near the port of Taean, South Chungcheong Province. It is commonly referred to as the Taean oil spill.

The Korean boy band Big Bang based their song, "붉은노을 ("Sunset Glow"), in honor of the caveman. The title track from their 2nd full-length Korean album, Sunset Glow, a remake of Lee Moon Sae's Red Sunset. Their Music Video for Sunset Glow is spreading the message to visit Tae-an beaches again after the 2007 Korea oil spill where it had previously struck the once populated tourist attraction a year ago, leaving it deserted and neglected.

Economy
Korea Express Air has its headquarters in Taean.

Military
The test site for a new Hyunmoo-type ballistic missile was publicly reported as being near Taean.

Festival
Taean holds the World Tulip Festival for a month from mid-April. The Taean World Tulip Festival is one of the world's top five tulip festivals following the WTS (World Tulip Summit) in 2015. Visitors can see the wide sea and sand beaches and millions of tulips. There are various events, including traditional folk experience, magic experience, soap bubble drop experience, and aroma experience.

Climate

Twin towns – sister cities

Taean is twinned with:

Domestic
 Seocho-gu, Seoul
 Gangseo-gu, Seoul
 Donghae City, Gangwon
 Suwon, Gyeonggi
 Goseong, South Gyeongsang
 Jecheon, North Chungcheong

International
  Tai'an, Shandong, China

See also

References

External links
County government website

 
Counties of South Chungcheong Province